Oenopota harpularioides is a species of sea snail, a marine gastropod mollusk in the family Mangeliidae.

The taxonomy is this species is uncertain. Relying on Tucker, the website |Gastropods.com states this species as Oenopota harpularius (Couthouy, J.P., 1838), while WoRMS states Oenopota harpularius as a synonym of Propebela harpularia (Couthouy, 1838)

Description
The length of the shell varies between 6 mm and 19 mm.

Distribution
This species occurs on boreal and arctic seas.

References

harpularioides
Gastropods described in 1987